Udupi Anantheshwara Temple is a historic Hindu temple dedicated to Lord Ananteshwara Parashurama (an avatar of Vishnu). The Anantheshwara temple is located in Udupi, India. The temple is a unique temple where Parashurama is worshipped in the form of Linga. Writer Roshen Dalal says, "According to texts, the city formed part of Parashurama Kshetra, the area is said to be claimed by Parashurama from the sea. Legends state that a king name Ramabhoja worshipped Parashurama here in the form of Linga, which then manifests itself on a silver seat (rajata pitha). Thus in Sanskrit texts, the city is known as  Rajata Pitha".  

The temple was renovated during the reign of the Alupas in the 8th century C.E. and is considered among the oldest in the Tulu Nadu region. Ananteshwara Temple is close to Chandramouleshwara Temple of Lord Shiva.

The temple is the oldest in Udupi managed by Puttige Matha, one of the Ashta Mathas of Udupi. This is the place where Jagadguru Sri Madhvacharya wrote many of his Tattvavada scripts, taught it to his disciples and got adrushya (disappeared) to Badari to stay along with Lord Vedavyasa.

References

Temples dedicated to avatars of Vishnu
8th-century Hindu temples
Parashurama temples
Hindu temples in Udupi district